Mukhametdinovo (Möxämätdin) is a rural locality (a village) in Oktyabrsky Selsoviet, Blagoveshchensky District, Bashkortostan, Russia. The population was 19 as of 2010. There are 2 streets.

Geography 
Mukhametdinovo is located 81 km northeast of Blagoveshchensk (the district's administrative centre) by road. Bolshoy Log is the nearest rural locality.

References 

Rural localities in Blagoveshchensky District